The Clue in the Old Stagecoach is the thirty-seventh volume in the Nancy Drew Mystery Stories series. It was first published in 1960 under the pseudonym Carolyn Keene. The actual author was ghostwriter Harriet Stratemeyer Adams.

Plot summary

Nancy searches for an antique stagecoach that, according to legend, contains something of great value to the people of Francisville.

References

External links
 
 The Clue in the Old Stagecoach at Fantastic Fiction

1960 American novels
1960 children's books
Children's mystery novels
Grosset & Dunlap books
Nancy Drew books